Mohamed Benameur (4 December 1959 – 30 December 2010) was an Algerian football player. He represented Algeria at the 1979 FIFA World Youth Championship.

Personal
Benameur was born on 4 December 1959. His first name is listed by various sources as Mohamed, Mustapha and Rachid.

Club career
Benameur began his career in the junior ranks of USM El Harrach. In November 1976, he made his senior debut in a league game against MC Oran.

In 1981, Benameur left USM El Harrach and joined WA Boufarik. He only remained at the club for one season before leaving to USM Alger, where he stayed just a few months. He then went on to play for RC Relizane, Hydra AC and a brief stint in Syria before ending his career before his 25th birthday.

International career
In November 1977, aged just 17 years old, Benameur was called up to the Algerian National Team by Rachid Mekhloufi for a 1978 African Cup of Nations qualifier against Zambia. However, he did not participate in the game as Algeria lost 2–0.

In 1978, Benameur was a member of the Algerian Under-20 team that won the 1979 African Youth Championship. A year later, he was a member of the Algerian Under-20 team at the 1979 FIFA World Youth Championship. He started all 4 of Algeria's games at the tournament before Algeria lost against Argentina in the second round.

Death
On 30 December 2010, Benameur died at the L'hopital Parnet in Algiers. He was buried in the El Alia Cemetery the following day.

Honours
 Won the 1979 African Youth Championship

References

External links
 

1959 births
2010 deaths
Algerian footballers
USM El Harrach players
USM Alger players
Algerian expatriate footballers
Expatriate footballers in Syria
Algeria youth international footballers
Association football midfielders
WA Boufarik players
Burials in Algeria
21st-century Algerian people